A coatee was a type of tight fitting uniform coat or jacket, which was waist length at the front and had short tails behind. The coatee began to replace the long tail coat in western armies at the end of the eighteenth century, but was itself superseded by the tunic in the mid nineteenth century.

A coatee, worn with a waistcoat or vest, remains part of formal Highland dress.

References

Coats (clothing)
Jackets
Military uniforms
History of clothing (Western fashion)
History of fashion